Bahman Gazali (also Romanized as Bahman Gazalī) is a village in Sepidar Rural District, in the Central District of Boyer-Ahmad County, Kohgiluyeh and Boyer-Ahmad Province, Iran. At the 2006 census, its population was 33, in 6 families.

References 

Populated places in Boyer-Ahmad County